Hamed Al Jazaf (born 20 October 1969) is a Bahrainian former midfielder who played for the Bahrain national football team in the Asian Cup tournament.

International records

References

External links

1969 births
Living people
Bahraini footballers
Bahrain international footballers
1988 AFC Asian Cup players
Association football midfielders